Tom Barry (born 10 October 1968) is a former Irish Fine Gael politician who served as a Teachta Dála (TD) for the Cork East constituency from 2011 to 2016.

Private life and career
Barry is a native of Killavullen, County Cork. He is a graduate in Biochemistry from University College Cork (UCC). He is the founder and CEO of a grain drying and warehousing business in his home village of Killavullen. He is also a tillage farmer. He is married to Kathy Quane, a lecturer of Anatomy in UCC's School of Medicine and Health and they have three children.

Political career
He was formerly a member of Cork County Council for the Mallow local electoral area. He was elected as a Fine Gael TD for the Cork East constituency at the 2011 general election on his first attempt.

In May 2013, he wrote to Cardinal Seán Brady and the Papal nuncio Charles John Brown asking whether he would be excommunicated if he voted for the Protection of Life During Pregnancy Bill 2013. Two months later, in July, Barry was seen on an Oireachtas television broadcast pulling his Fine Gael colleague Deputy Áine Collins onto his lap during a parliamentary debate. Barry later apologised publicly for his behaviour, saying he had been drinking earlier at the Dáil bar (a bar in the Irish parliament), and the Fine Gael party and his wife condemned his behaviour.

He lost his seat at the 2016 general election.

References

1968 births
Living people
Alumni of University College Cork
Fine Gael TDs
20th-century Irish farmers
Local councillors in County Cork
Members of the 31st Dáil
Politicians from County Cork
21st-century Irish farmers